L'Escalier de L'Art, also known as the L'Escalier de Saint-Nicolas is a public stairway in Beirut, Lebanon.  It is located in the Rmeil district, providing a pedestrian link between Rue Gouraud and Rue Sursock uphill.  Its proximity to the Sursock Museum and the Greek Orthodox Archbishopric of Beirut on Rue Sursock, make the 125 steps and 500 meters span staircase, believed to be the longest in the region, a very popular destination for tourists visiting Beirut.

Open-air art exhibition
Since 1973, the stairs have been used as an open-air art exhibition site that occurs twice every year.  While the official and most known name of the "Montmartre-influenced" stairs is L'Escalier de Saint-Nicolas, the stairs are also referred to as L'Escalier de L'Art due to the numerous Gemayze art exhibitions that take place on the stairs.

References

External links

St. Nicholas Center
L'Escalier de L'Art
Gemayze Art

Streets in Beirut
Buildings and structures in Beirut
Tourist attractions in Beirut